Partnership on AI (full name Partnership on Artificial Intelligence to Benefit People and Society) is a nonprofit coalition committed to the responsible use of artificial intelligence. It researches best practices for artificial intelligence systems and to educate the public about AI.  Publicly announced September 28, 2016, its founding members are Amazon, Facebook, Google, DeepMind, Microsoft, and IBM, with interim co-chairs Eric Horvitz of Microsoft Research and Mustafa Suleyman of DeepMind. Apple joined the consortium as a founding member in January 2017. More than 100 partners from academia, civil society, industry, and nonprofits are member organizations in 2019.

In January 2017, Apple head of advanced development for Siri, Tom Gruber, joined the Partnership on AI's board. In October 2017, Terah Lyons joined the Partnership on AI as the organization's founding executive director. Lyons brought to the organization her expertise in technology governance, with a specific focus in machine intelligence, AI, and robotics policy, having formerly served as Policy Advisor to the United States Chief Technology Officer Megan Smith. Lyons was succeeded by Partnership on AI board member Rebecca Finlay as interim executive director. Finlay was named CEO of Partnership on AI on October 26, 2021.

In October 2018, Baidu became the first Chinese firm to join the Partnership.

In November 2020 the Partnership on AI announced the AI Incident Database (AIID), which shifted to a new special-purpose independent non-profit in 2022.

On October 26, 2021, Rebecca Finlay was named CEO.

References

External links
 
 The AI Incident Database

Artificial intelligence associations
Organizations established in 2016
Existential risk from artificial general intelligence